Goodall Edward Gondwe (born 1 December 1936) is a Malawian economist who served in the cabinet of Malawi as Minister of Finance from 2014 to 2019. Previously he was Minister of Finance from 2004 to 2009, Minister of Local Government from 2009 to 2010, and Minister of Natural Resources, Energy and Environment Affairs from 2011 to 2012.

Gondwe was director of the Africa Division of the International Monetary Fund before returning to Malawi to work as a politician. In the period leading up to his election as Member of Parliament, he served as the Chief Economic Advisor to President Bakili Muluzi.

Early life and education

Gondwe was born on 1 December 1936 and is from Kayiwonanga village, Mzimba in the Northern Region of Malawi. He lived and worked in Ivory Coast and in Virginia in the United States. He received his undergraduate training from the University of London, graduating with a B.Sc. in economics. Upon graduation, he received a number of appointments to national and international financial institutions, including: General Manager of the Reserve Bank of Malawi; Senior Vice President and Acting President of the African Development Bank; Senior Advisor, Director for Africa and Special Advisor to the managing director of the International Monetary Fund; and Chief Economic Advisor to President Bakili Muluzi.

Political career
Gondwe began his political career serving as an economic adviser to Bakili Muluzi and subsequently Bingu wa Mutharika. He did not want to go deep in politics but was forced to do so after the conviction and sentencing to jail of the incumbent MP of Mzimba North. He rose up in the ranks in both Malawi's cabinet and the Democratic Progressive Party.

Finance Minister of Malawi
Gondwe was appointed to the position of Minister of Finance in June 2004 by President Bingu wa Mutharika. He has been credited for Malawi's success during Mutharika's first term. His economic development policies, together with Mutharika, helped drastically improve the economic situation in the country. Under his stewardship the rate of inflation fell from 30% in 2005 to 6% by 2008. More importantly Malawi saw its economy grow by approximately 6 percent. Malawi is a relatively small economy due to its low natural resources compared to its neighbours like Zambia, Tanzania and Zimbabwe. In 2008 Gondwe was voted as Africa's Finance Minister of the Year at the African Banker Awards, held at the Willard Intercontinental Hotel in Washington DC, USA. The Nyasa Times of Malawi calls him the “Engine room for Malawi economic achievements."”

Paladin Energy
Gondwe played a primary role in negotiating the contract and agreement with the Australian uranium mining company Paladin Energy, which was Malawi's first uranium mining company. Gondwe noted that the exploration of uranium would boost the country’s export base. The revenue for the uranium was projected to exceed proceeds from tobacco, Malawi's main foreign exchange earner. During this time, the Minister of Energy and Mining was Henry Chimunthu Banda. The uranium project also promised to transform the under-developed Kayelekera which is in the underdeveloped northern region by turning it into a prosperous town. It was expected to create jobs for 800 people during the construction and 280 people during the operation. The project and Paladin Energy, however, has received some criticism for labor, health and environmental risks by the public.

Minister of Local Government
Following the May 2009 general election, Mutharika reshuffled his cabinet and Gondwe's portfolio, moving him from Minister of Finance to Minister of Local Government. He was replaced as Minister of Finance by Ken Kandodo, nephew of former President Hastings Banda, who was later replaced after nationwide strikes against economic mismanagement and the unveiling of his Zero Deficit Budget.

Events since 2011
On August 1, 2011 he was appointed as Vice-President of the Democratic Progressive Party (DPP) by the party's National Governing Council. Shortly after this he was appointed as Minister of Natural Resources.

In October 2012, Gondwe announced he would be resigning from the DPP and retiring from politics altogether at the 2014 general elections. However, Gondwe was again appointed as Minister of Finance by President Peter Mutharika in June 2014.

Awards
Africa's "Finance Minister of the Year", African Banker Awards – 2008

References

1936 births
Living people
People from Mzimba District
Democratic Progressive Party (Malawi) politicians
Finance ministers of Malawi
Government ministers of Malawi
Malawian bankers
20th-century Malawian economists
Alumni of the University of London